Kansai may refer to:

 Kansai region (Kansai-chihō), Honshu, Japan
 Kansai dialect (Kansai-ben) of the Japanese language
 Kansai cuisine
 Kansai International Airport (IATA airport code: KIX; ICAO airport code: RJBB) Osaka Bay, Japan
 Kansai University (Kansai Daigaku) in  Suita, Osaka, Japan
 Kansai Telecasting Corporation (KTV, Kansai TV)
 Kansai Main Line (Kansai-honsen) rail line
 Kansai Airlines, defunct airline
 Kansai Maru (ship Kansai) shipwrecked freighter

See also
 Kinki (disambiguation), "Kinki" is a nickname for "Kansai"